Bashumiyan Sahukar Government First Grade College, Manvi  is a government first grade college in raichur district in Karnataka state, India.

Description
Government First Grade College, Manvi  is a general degree college located at Manavi, Raichur, Karnataka. It was established in the year 1987. The college is affiliated with Gulbarga University. Affiliated College of Gulbarga University. This college offers different courses in arts, science and commerce.

Departments

Science
Physics
Chemistry
Mathematics
Computer Science

Arts and Commerce
Kannada
English
History
Political Science
Sociology
Economics
Business Administration Commerce

References

External links
 

Educational institutions established in 1987
1987 establishments in Karnataka
Colleges affiliated to Raichur University
Universities and colleges in Raichur district
Manvi
 Education in Raichur district